The 2008–09 Radford Highlanders men's basketball team represented Radford University during the 2008–09 NCAA Division I men's basketball season. The Highlanders, led by second-year head coach Brad Greenberg, played their home games at the Dedmon Center in Radford, Virginia as members of the Big South Conference. They finished the season 21–12, 15–3 in Big South play to finish in first place. They defeated High Point, UNC Asheville, and VMI to become champions of the Big South tournament. The received the Big South's automatic bid to the NCAA tournament where they were defeated in the first round by the eventual National champions, North Carolina.

Roster 

Source

Schedule and results

|-
!colspan=9 style=| Regular season

|-
!colspan=9 style=| Big South tournament

|-
!colspan=9 style=| NCAA tournament

References 

Radford Highlanders men's basketball seasons
Radford
Radford
Radford
Radford